Amblyanthus is the name or synonym of a plant genus that may refer to:

Amblyanthus A.DC., a genus in the family Primulaceae
Amblyanthus (Schltr.) Brieger, a synonym of Dendrobium